Ségué Iré is a rural commune in the Cercle of Bandigara of the Mopti Region of Mali. The commune contains 18 villages and in the 2009 census had a population of 14,099. The administrative centre (chef-lieu) is the village of Sougui.

References

External links
.
.

Communes of Mopti Region